

Quintard Taylor is a historian, founder of BlackPast.org, an online encyclopedia dedicated to provide public with information concerning African American history, and former professor of University of Washington.

Personal life
Taylor was born in December 11, 1948 to Quintard Taylor Sr. and Grace Taylor in Brownsville, Tennessee. He finished his high school in Brownsville, Tennessee. Taylor completed his B.A. from St. Augustine's College in 1969 in American History, and finished his M.A. degree and his Ph.D. from the University of Minnesota in 1971 and 1977, respectively in History.

While he was a teacher at the Washington State University, he married Carolyn and he had three children, Quintard III, and twins, William and Jamila.

He taught in several universities including, Washington State University, California Polytechnic State University, and University of Oregon, and University of Washington, until his retirement in June 2018. He was also responsible for various research works in these universities.
Except for his research articles, he published several books and articles, including, The Forging of a Black Community: A History of Seattle's Central District, The Forging of a Black Community: Seattle's Central District from 1870 through the Civil Rights Era, In Search of the Racial Frontier: African Americans in the American West 1528-1990.

Except for his research articles, he published several books and articles, including, The Forging of a Black Community: A History of Seattle's Central District, The Forging of a Black Community: Seattle's Central District from 1870 through the Civil Rights Era, In Search of the Racial Frontier: African Americans in the American West 1528-1990.

Education

Early education 
Taylor graduated from Carver High School in Brownsville, Tennessee. He finished his high school graduation with 10th place among 210 students. His parents did not graduate from college but they motivated him to attend college. After graduating from high school he started his B.A. education.

College 
In sixties, there were changes in West Tennessee initiated by Civil Right Movement which attracted him to study history. He started his B.A. education, at the age of 16, in St. Augustine's College, North Carolina in American history and graduated in 1969.

Graduate school 
After finishing college, he started his M.A. degree in the University of Minnesota which later proved to be a factor for Taylor to search the new curriculum of African American history study. Allan Spear was one of the professors who introduced an African American history program called African Peoples at the University of Minnesota. Spear was first elected to the Minnesota Senate in 1972, representing a liberal Minneapolis district centered on the University of Minnesota. Taylor graduated in 1971.

In 1975, after teaching for four years at Washington State University, he started his Ph.D. program at the University of Minnesota. He finished his graduation in 1977 in History.

Career

Early in his career 
Having finished his graduation from University of Minnesota in 1971, Taylor started his career as assistant professor at the Washington State University (WSU) in 1971. He was hired into the newly formed Black Studies program and there he became one of two full-time Black Studies professors at the university. He taught in that university 4 years until 1975 before starting his PhD.

Career as professor of history 
After completion of his doctorate in 1977, he started to look for a job to settle in with his family. He became a professor of history at California Polytechnic State University in 1977. He continued to teach there for over 12 years until 1990.

In 1987, he became a professor of history at the University of Lagos, Akoka, Nigeria. He taught there until 1988.

Next, in 1990, he became a professor of history at University of Oregon. He continuously taught there 9 years until 1999.

Scott & Dorothy Bullitt Professor of American History 
Finally, in 1999, he became a professor of American History at the University of Washington. He continued to teach there for over 18 years until his retirement in June 2018.

Published Works

Books 
 The Making of the Modern World: A Reader in 20th Century Global History (Dubuque, Iowa: Kendall-Hunt Publishing Company, 1990)
 The Forging of a Black Community: A History of Seattle's Central District (Seattle: University of Washington, 2022)
 In Search of the Racial Frontier: African Americans in the American West, 1528-1990 (New York: W.W. Norton, 1998) Nominated for a Pulitzer Prize in History
 Lawrence B. de Graaf, Kevin Mulroy and Quintard Taylor, eds. Seeking El Dorado: African Americans in California, 1769-1997 (Seattle: University of Washington Press, 2001)
 Shirley Ann Wilson Moore and Quintard Taylor, eds. African American Women Confront the West, 1600-2000 (Norman: University of Oklahoma Press, 2003)
 From Timbuktu to Katrina: Readings in African American History, Vol. 1, (Boston: Thomson Wadsworth, 2008)
 From Timbuktu to Katrina: Readings in African American History, Vol. 2 (Belmont:Wadsworth Publishing, 2007),
 America-I-Am Black Facts: The Story of a People Through Timelines, 1601-2000 (New York: Tavis Smiley Books, 2009)
 Dr. Sam, Soldier, Educator, Advocate, Friend: The Autobiography of Samuel Eugene Kelly (Seattle: University of Washington Press, 2010)

Website 
 Founder and Director, BlackPast.org Website.

TV Series 
 African Americans in the West T.V. Series, January–February 2006.

Recognition

Award 

 Washington State Jefferson Award 2015.
 Quintard Taylor Awarded Robert Gray Medal by Washington State Historical Society 2017
 Quintard Taylor wins lifetime achievement award

Others 

 Quintard Taylor Featured in KPLU Article.
 Quintard Taylor Featured in Pacific NW Magazine
 President Ana Mari Cauce Acclaimed Professor Emeritus Quintard Taylor's Contributions to Black History 2021

References

External links 
 Dr. Quintard Taylor Interview Details

21st-century African-American writers
African-American historians
Historians of African Americans
University of Oregon faculty
20th-century American historians
University of Washington faculty
University of Minnesota alumni
1948 births
Living people
St. Augustine's University (North Carolina) alumni
Washington State University faculty
People from Brownsville, Tennessee
American expatriates in Nigeria
Academic staff of the University of Lagos
California Polytechnic State University faculty
20th-century American male writers
21st-century American male writers
21st-century American historians
20th-century African-American writers
African-American male writers